Robin Haase and Matwé Middelkoop were the defending champions, but Middelkoop chose to compete in Båstad instead.

Haase played alongside Philipp Oswald and successfully defended the title, defeating Oliver Marach and Jürgen Melzer in the final, 7–5, 6–7(2–7), [14–12].

Seeds

Draw

Draw

References
 Main Draw

Croatia Open Umag - Doubles